Fresnillo de las Dueñas is a municipality located in the province of Burgos, Castile and León, Spain. According to the 2004 census (INE), the municipality has a population of 349 inhabitants.

On 1 February 1095, Count García Ordóñez and his wife, Infanta Urraca Garcés, sister of Sancho IV of Navarre, granted a fuero of privileges to Fresnillo, then a part of their lordship centred on Nájera.

Notes

Municipalities in the Province of Burgos